Len Rowles works in the British film industry.

Her films include Skyborn and Orbit Ever After. The latter starred Thomas Brodie-Sangster and Mackenzie Crook.
and was nominated at the BAFTAs for Best Short Film.

References

External links
 

Living people
Year of birth missing (living people)
Place of birth missing (living people)